Dance Music Festival which took place on 14 November 2008, twenty minutes of the coast of Abu Dhabi, UAE and 15 November in Forum de Beirut, Lebanon. The festival were proclaimed the first festival dedicated to dance music in the Middle East.

Artists 
Abu Dhabi 14 November 2008

Main Stage : Marco V, ATB, Cosmic Gate, Nic Fanciulli, Meat Katie, Pierre Ravan, Afroboogie, Dimi el, Hush on Bongos.

Pool Stage: Sandy Rivera, Wally Lopez, Charl Chaka, Danny Neville, DJ Bliss, Rita X craft.

Beirut 15 November 2008 : Christopher Lawrence, John Acquaviva, Cosmic Gate, Wally Lopez, John '00' Fleming, Lee Haslam, Ronin & Nesta, Fady Ferraye.

See also

List of electronic music festivals
Live electronic music
music of lebanon

References

Music festivals established in 2008
Dance music
Electronic music festivals in Lebanon
Electronic music festivals in the United Arab Emirates
Music festivals in Lebanon
Music festivals in the United Arab Emirates